Clyde E. Robbins (born 1931) is a retired United States Coast Guard vice admiral. He served as  Director of Intelligence and Security for the U.S. Secretary of Transportation as well as the Federal On Scene Coordinator for the Exxon Valdez oil spill cleanup.

References

1931 births
Living people
United States Coast Guard admirals
Place of birth missing (living people)
Date of birth missing (living people)